Freek van der Wart (born 1 February 1988) is a retired Dutch male short track speed skater.

References

External links
 

1988 births
Living people
Dutch male short track speed skaters
Olympic short track speed skaters of the Netherlands
Short track speed skaters at the 2014 Winter Olympics
Sportspeople from Voorburg
21st-century Dutch people